naturéO is a small chain of supermarkets in France carrying natural and organic products.  By early 2012, the chain will consist of 11 stores spread throughout the many regions of France.

Mission statement 

The company is committed to many progressive ideals,  similar to that of Whole Foods Market in the United States.  The commitments include:
 Answer the need for healthy eating.
 Offer the largest selection of 100% organic products.
 Make organic products accessible to all through reasonable prices.
 Develop equitable partnerships with producers.
 Help preserve resources for future generations.
 Enhance the vitality and the excellence of team members.
 Be responsible, ethical and excited for the future.

History

2007: Chartres, Ballainvilliers and Corbeil 

In 2007, Xavier Travers opened the first naturéO store in Chartres.  Soon after, Xavier opened new locations in Ballainvilliers and in Corbeil.

2009-2010: Ballainvilliers, Evry, Égly and Rambouillet 

Having achieved sales of €4 million EUR after 18 months of operation, Xavier opened four new sites in the Paris region between 2009 and 2010.

2011: Fresnes, Le Mans, Orgeval, Mondeville, Cormontreuil 

naturéO Le Mans opened in June, 2011.

naturéO Fresnes opened on May 18, 2011.

Additional stores in Orgeval, Mondeville, Cormontreuil will also be open by the end of the year.

References 

Food and drink companies of France
French brands
Companies based in Centre-Val de Loire